Garjumak (also Romanized as Garjūmak; also known as Garjermak) is a village in Eskelabad Rural District, Nukabad District, Khash County, Sistan and Baluchestan Province, Iran. At the 2006 census, its population was 63, in 14 families.

References 

Populated places in Khash County